The 131st Armored Division "Centauro" was an armored division of the Italian Army during World War II. The division was formed in April 1939 by expanding the I Armored Brigade. The division's name came from the mythological race of half human-half horse creatures named Centaurs. The division participated in the invasion of Albania, Greco-Italian War, and invasion of Yugoslavia. In August 1942 the division was sent to Libya to participate in the Western Desert Campaign. After the Axis defeat at the Second Battle of El Alamein the division retreated with the German-Italian Panzer Army to Tunisia, where the division participated in the Tunisian Campaign. On 18 April 1943 the division was disbanded due to the losses suffered in the Battle of El Guettar.

History 
On 1 June 1936 the I Motor-mechanized Brigade was formed in Siena, which consisted of the 5th Bersaglieri Regiment and other minor units. On 15 July 1937 the 31st Tank Infantry Regiment was formed in Siena and assigned to the brigade. On the same date the brigade was renamed I Armored Brigade. On 20 April 1939 the 131st Armored Artillery Regiment was formed in Cremona and assigned to the brigade, which on that date was renamed 131st Armored Division "Centauro".

World War II

Greco-Italian War 
In April 1939 Italy invaded Albania and formed the Italian protectorate of Albania. In summer 1939 the division moved to Tirana. On 28 October 1940 the division participated in the Italian attack on Greece with started the Greco-Italian War. The main body of the division advanced towards Kalpaki in Epirus but Greek resistance stopped the division before reaching its goals. On 23 November 1940 the Greek launched an offensive, which drove the Italian units back into Albania. The Centauro unsuccessfully tried to stop the Greek advance at the Battle of Klisura Pass and then in Tepelenë. Due to the heavy losses the division was taken out of the line on 4 February 1941 to be rebuilt. The 31st Tank Infantry Regiment was reinforced with the IV Tank Battalion "M" from the 32nd Tank Infantry Regiment, while the 5th Bersaglieri Regiment was replaced by the 1st Bersaglieri Regiment.

Invasion of Yugoslavia 
In late March 1940 the division moved in preparation for the Invasion of Yugoslavia to Shkodër in northern Albania. After the war's start on 6 April 1940 the Centauro together with the 18th Infantry Division "Messina" and 32nd Infantry Division "Marche" defeated a Yugoslav attack towards Shkodër. On 16 April 1940 the division crossed into Yugoslavia north of Koplik and advanced to Kotor, Cetinje and Podgorica. On 17 April the Centauro reached Trebinje, where it met up with units of the 133rd Armored Division "Littorio", which had advanced southward from Istria. On 11 May 1941 the division began the return transfer to its bases in Tuscany. On 31 July 1941 the 5th Bersaglieri Regiment returned to the division and relieved the 1st Bersaglieri Regiment.

North Africa 
Due to the experience of fighting in the Western Desert Italian armored Divisions were re-organized in 1942 and consisted on paper of three tank and three infantry battalions, a large artillery regiment, two battalions of self-propelled guns, one anti-aircraft battalion, one reconnaissance grouping, and a mixed engineer battalions. In October 1942 the Centauro was transferred to Libya. The division did not participate in the Second Battle of El Alamein and the first units of the division arrived at the front during the retreat from Egypt in late 1942.

On 13 December 1942 the units of the division already in Libya and the Tactical Group "Ariete" forced the British 7th Armoured Division to retreat during the Battle of El Agheila. The division retreated with Axis forces from Libya to Tunisia, where the division ceded part of its units to the L Special Brigade and part of its materiel to other divisions. During the Battle of the Kasserine Pass troops of the Centauro overran the part of the US forces defending Highway 13.

The division participated in the Battle of El Guettar, where it was severely decimated. From 7 April 1943 the division's remaining personnel and equipment were assigned to the 16th Infantry Division "Pistoia". On 18 April 1943 the Centauro was declared lost due to wartime events.

136th Armored Legionary Division "Centauro" 

On 15 August 1943 the Royal Italian Army activated the 136th Armored Legionary Division "Centauro", which continued the tradition of the 131st Armored Division "Centauro". After the announcement of the Armistice of Cassibile on 8 September 1943 the 136th Armored Legionary Division "Centauro" was disbanded by the invading Germans on 12 September 1943.

Post War 
On 1 April 1951 the Italian Army raised the Armored Brigade "Centauro" in Verona, which on 1 November 1959 was expanded to Armored Division "Centauro".

Organization

Organization in Italy 
  131st Armored Division "Centauro"
 5th Bersaglieri Regiment
 Command Company
 XIV Auto-transported Bersaglieri Battalion
 XXII Bersaglieri Motorcyclists Battalion (reorganized as XXII Bersaglieri Support Weapons Battalion in September 1941)
 XXIV Auto-transported Bersaglieri Battalion (joined the regiment in 1940)
 5th Anti-tank Company (47/32 anti-tank guns; entered the XXII Bersaglieri Support Weapons Battalion in September 1941)
 5th Bersaglieri Motorcyclists (formed in September 1941)
 31st Tank Infantry Regiment
 Command Company
 I Tank Battalion "L" (L3/35 tankettes; disbanded in October 1941)
 II Tank Battalion "L" (L3/35 tankettes; disbanded in October 1941)
 III Tank Battalion "L" (L3/35 tankettes; disbanded in September 1941 to form the LI Tank Battalion "M")
 IV Tank Battalion "L" (L3/35 tankettes; disbanded in September 1941 to form the LI Tank Battalion "M")
 IV Tank Battalion "M" (M13/40 tanks; arrived from the 32nd Tank Infantry Regiment in February 1941; transferred to the 133rd Tank Infantry Regiment in February 1942)
 XII Tank Battalion "M" (M14/41 tanks; arrived from the 32nd Tank Infantry Regiment in October 1941; transferred to the 133rd Tank Infantry Regiment in November 1941)
 XIII Tank Battalion "M" (M13/40 tanks; arrived from the 32nd Tank Infantry Regiment in October 1941; transferred to the 132nd Tank Infantry Regiment in summer 1942)
 XIV Tank Battalion "M" (M14/41 tanks, joined the regiment in spring 1942)
 XV Tank Battalion "M" (M14/41 tanks, joined the regiment in spring 1942)
 XVII Tank Battalion "M" (M14/41 tanks, joined the regiment in spring 1942)
 LI Tank Battalion "M" (M14/41 tanks; formed in September 1941; transferred to the 133rd Tank Infantry Regiment in February 1942)
 131st Tank Infantry Regiment (Assigned to the division from 27 July 1941 to 2 January 1942)
 Command Company
 CI Tank Battalion "R35" (captured French Renault R35 light tanks)
 CII Tank Battalion "R35" (captured French R35 light tanks)
 CC Tank Battalion "S35" (captured French SOMUA S35 tanks)
 131st Motorized Artillery Regiment "Centauro"
 Command Unit
 I Group (75/27 field guns)
 II Group (75/27 field guns)
 2x Anti-aircraft batteries (20/65 Mod. 35 anti-aircraft guns)
 Ammunition and Supply Unit
 131st Anti-tank Company (47/32 anti-tank guns)
 141st Anti-tank Company (47/32 anti-tank guns; transferred to the 9th Infantry Division "Pasubio" for the deployment in the Soviet Union)
 131st Mixed Engineer Company
 131st Medical Section
 131st Supply Section
 131st Transport Section
 106th Carabinieri Section
 131st Field Post Office

Organization in North Africa 
  131st Armored Division "Centauro"
 Armored Reconnaissance Grouping "Cavalleggeri di Lodi"
 Command Squadron
 I Squadrons Group (AB 41 armored cars and L6/40 tanks; transferred to the L Special Brigade)
 II Squadrons Group (47/32 L40 self-propelled guns and 20/65 Mod. 35 anti-aircraft guns)
 5th Bersaglieri Regiment
 Command Company
 XIV Auto-transported Bersaglieri Battalion
 XXII Bersaglieri Support Weapons Battalion
 XXIV Auto-transported Bersaglieri Battalion
 5th Bersaglieri Motorcyclists Company
 31st Tank Infantry Regiment
 Command Company
 XIV Tank Battalion "M" (M14/41 tanks)
 XV Tank Battalion "M" (M14/41 tanks; transferred to the L Special Brigade)
 XVII Tank Battalion "M" (M14/41 tanks)
 131st Motorized Artillery Regiment "Centauro"
 Command Battery
 I Group (100/17 howitzers
 II Group (75/27 howitzers)
 III Group (75/27 howitzers)
 DI Anti-aircraft Artillery Group
 2x Anti-aircraft/Anti-tank batteries (90/53 anti-aircraft guns mounted on Breda 51 trucks)
 2x Anti-aircraft batteries (20/65 Mod. 35 anti-aircraft guns)
 132nd Anti-tank Regiment (joined the division in 1943)
 Command Company
 I Anti-tank Battalion "Ariete" (47/32 anti-tank guns; formed with survivors of the 132nd Armored Division "Ariete")
 II Anti-tank Battalion "Littorio" (47/3 anti-tank guns; formed with survivors of the 133rd Armored Division "Littorio")
 III Anti-tank Battalion "Trieste" (47/3 anti-tank guns; formed with survivors of the 101st Motorized Division "Trieste")
 CXXXVI Self-propelled Anti-tank Battalion (47/32 L40 self-propelled guns)
 DLVII Self-propelled Artillery Group (75/18 self-propelled guns; transferred to the L Special Brigade)
 DLIX Self-propelled Artillery Group (75/18 self-propelled guns)
 XXXI Mixed Engineer Battalion
 131st Engineer Company
 231st Connections Company
 131st Medical Section
 131st Supply Section
 131st Transport Section
 106th Carabinieri Section
 131st Field Post Office (replaced in February 1943 by the 212th Field Post Office)

Attached to the division during the Tunisian campaign:
 XVIII Carabinieri Battalion

Commanding officers 
The division's commanding officers were:

 Generale di Brigata Giovanni Magli (1939 - 24 December 1940)
 Colonel Mario Giglioni (acting, 25–30 December 1940)
 Generale di Brigata Gioacchino Solinas (acting, 31 December 1940 - 3 February 1941)
 Generale di Brigata Giovanni Magli (4-23 February 1941)
 Generale di Brigata Gavino Pizzolato (24 February 1941 - 28 February 1942)
 Generale di Divisione Giorgio Calvi di Bergolo (1 March 1942 - 18 April 1943)

References

Bibliography 
 
 George F. Nafziger - Italian Order of Battle: An organizational history of the Italian Army in World War II (3 vol)
 John Joseph Timothy Sweet - Iron Arm: The Mechanization of Mussolini's Army, 1920-1940

Divisions of Italy in World War II
Armored divisions of Italy
Military units and formations of Italy in Yugoslavia in World War II
Italian military units and formations of the Greco-Italian War